Slave Lake is a town in northern Alberta, Canada that is surrounded by the Municipal District of Lesser Slave River No. 124. It is located on the southeast shore of Lesser Slave Lake at the junction of Highway 2 and Highway 88.

Slave Lake serves as a local centre for the area. The administrative office for the Sawridge First Nation is also located in the town.

History 
The first European known to visit the area of the present-day Town of Slave Lake was the British explorer David Thompson, who arrived in 1799. Following his brief visit, other British agents established several fur trading posts around Slave Lake, including a Hudson's Bay Company post at the mouth of the lake. 

A settlement developed around the post and became known as Sawridge. It was renamed as Slave Lake in 1923. After a flood in the 1930s destroyed much of the town, it was relocated and rebuilt at its current location on higher ground. It was incorporated as a town in 1965.

The Town of Slave Lake was inundated by a flood of Sawridge Creek in July 1988.

2011 wildfire 

On May 15, 2011, large parts of the town were affected by wildfires in the area. Winds pushed the flames into town, destroying many houses and businesses. Mandatory evacuation orders were issued, but highways had been closed and residents were urged to seek refuge at beaches, large parking lots, and open spaces. Highway 2 had been closed at the outset of the fire, but eventually re-opened for evacuation. Full evacuation of all residents was ordered for Slave Lake.

On May 16, 2011, provincial officials said that 40% of the town had been destroyed or damaged by the fires, including the town hall, the library, a radio station, a mall, and a significant number of homes and other buildings. No injuries or deaths were reported. On May 17, 2011, Mayor Karina Pillay-Kinnee indicated one-third of the town had been destroyed by the wildfire. On May 20, 2011, a firefighting helicopter crashed into the Lesser Slave Lake near Canyon Creek; its pilot died at the scene.

On July 6, Prince William and Catherine, the Duke and Duchess of Cambridge, visited the town to offer encouragement to residents and support for rebuilding efforts.

Geography

Climate
Slave Lake experiences a subarctic climate (Köppen climate classification Dfc) that borders on a humid continental climate (Köppen Dfb). Summers tend to be mild with cool nights, while winters are long and severely cold.

Demographics 

In the 2016 Census of Population conducted by Statistics Canada, the Town of Slave Lake recorded a population of 6,651 living in 2,329 of its 2,762 total private dwellings, a  change from its 2011 population of 6,782.

The population of the Town of Slave Lake according to its 2007 municipal census was 7,031.

Sports 
In 1994, the town hosted the Arctic Winter Games. This is a celebration of circumpolar sports and culture.

Government 
Residents of Slave Lake are in the electoral district of Peace River—Westlock for elections to the House of Commons of Canada, and Lesser Slave Lake for elections to the Legislative Assembly of Alberta.

Media 
Media outlets serving Slave Lake and surrounding area include BOOM (FM) and the Lakeside Leader, a local community newspaper.

Notable people 

 Walter Patrick Twinn- Chief of the Sawridge First Nation starting in 1966, and Senator from 1990 to 1997. 
 Scott Cyr, Member of the Legislative Assembly of Alberta for Bonnyville-Cold Lake, May 5, 2015 – March 19, 2019

 Nicolas Aubé-Kubel, Professional Hockey Player of the National Hockey League.

Gallery

See also 
List of communities in Alberta
List of towns in Alberta

References

External links 

1961 establishments in Alberta
Towns in Alberta